Elizabeth Dee Shaw Stewart Stadium is an outdoor multi-purpose stadium in the western United States, located on the campus of Weber State University in Ogden, Utah. Originally Wildcat Stadium, it was renamed in 1998 for Stewart (1905–1996), a notable campus and community benefactor.

Used primarily for football, the 17,312-seat venue is the home of the Weber State Wildcats of the Big Sky Conference. It was expanded in 1966 with the construction of the primary grandstand along the northwest sideline, nearly doubling its capacity.

Stewart Stadium is also the home venue for Weber State's outdoor track and field teams.

See also
 List of NCAA Division I FCS football stadiums

References

External links
 Weber State University Athletics – Stewart Stadium

College football venues
Sports venues in Utah
Weber State Wildcats football
Multi-purpose stadiums in the United States
Sports venues in Ogden, Utah
Sports venues completed in 1966
1966 establishments in Utah